"Danger" is a song performed and produced by Blahzay Blahzay, issued as the lead single from their debut album Blah Blah Blah. The song contains many samples, including "Get It Together" by Beastie Boys and Q-Tip, "Rockin' Chair" by Gwen McCrae, and "Come Clean" by Jeru the Damaja. Recorded in 1994 but not released until 1995, the song became the group's only entry on the Billboard Hot 100, peaking at No. 46 in 1995.

Chart positions

References

1993 songs
Blahzay Blahzay songs
1995 debut singles
Mercury Records singles
Songs written by Blowfly (musician)
Songs written by Jeru the Damaja
Songs written by Shelly Manne
Songs written by Q-Tip (musician)
Songs written by Willie Clarke (songwriter)